Edward Anderson (February 1, 1820 – December 11, 1896) was a state legislator in Texas during the Reconstruction era. He served in the Texas House of Representatives for District 14 in 1873. Anderson was unseated later that year after testimony from fellow legislators.

A former slave, he was documented as a farmer.

References

Members of the Texas House of Representatives
African-American politicians during the Reconstruction Era
Impeached United States officials removed from office
Farmers from Texas
American former slaves
19th-century American slaves
1820 births
1896 deaths